Sir Gordon Frederick Tietjens   (born 9 December 1955) is head coach of the Samoa rugby sevens team, and a celebrated former coach of the New Zealand men's national team in rugby sevens, the All Blacks Sevens. When the International Rugby Board inducted him into the IRB Hall of Fame in May 2012, it said that "Tietjens' roll of honour is without peer in Sevens, and perhaps in the Game of Rugby as a whole." According to Spiro Zavos, Tietjens is "The greatest of all the Sevens coaches".

As of his induction, he had coached the All Blacks Sevens to 10 series titles in the IRB Sevens World Series, the Rugby World Cup Sevens crown in 2001, and gold medals in four of the five Commonwealth Games in which the sport had been contested, losing the 2014 final in Glasgow. He has also added two more IRB Sevens series titles (2013 and 2014), and a second Rugby World Cup Sevens crown (also in 2013).

Player development
Tietjens has coached many young players who have gone on to become All Blacks, including Christian Cullen, Jonah Lomu, Joe Rokocoko, Mils Muliaina, Rico Gear, Cory Jane, Ben Smith, Rieko Ioane, Israel Dagg, and Liam Messam. Tietjens coached 44 players who went on to become All Blacks in the 15-a-side game and before his retirement, he was the only remaining active international coach from the amateur era.

Tietjens is currently assisted by Eric Rush, a former long-serving captain of the New Zealand Sevens team and a former Sevens star himself.

Olympics
In 2012, his contract as the NZ Sevens coach was extended through to 2016. This allows Tietjens to be part of Sevens rugby's first inclusion in the Olympic Games. According to then-World Rugby chairman Bernard Lapasset, sevens' inclusion in the Olympics was "in no small way down to Gordon Tietjens. Through his knowledge, passion, and expertise, he has driven the standards towards what we now celebrate as a truly global game of sevens."

In the 1999 New Year Honours, Tietjens was appointed a Member of the New Zealand Order of Merit (MNZM); in the 2007 New Year Honours, he was elevated to Companion of the same order (CNZM), and in the 2013 Queen's Birthday Honours, he was further promoted to a Knight Companion of the New Zealand Order of Merit (KNZM).

After an unsuccessful 2016 Olympics campaign, Tietjens stepped down from the All Black Sevens coaching position.

Samoa
In October 2016, Tietjens accepted the role of coach to the Samoa national sevens team.
In 2020, he announced that he would be stepping down from the head coaching role for the Samoa national sevens team stating that he wanted Samoa to be able to plan for the future

Achievements
 Playing honours: New Zealand Barbarians
 Member of the first national New Zealand Hong Kong Sevens Team (1983)
 New Zealand Sevens Head Coach (1994–2016)
 IRB Sevens World Series Champions (2000, 2001, 2002, 2003, 2004, 2005, 2007, 2008, 2011, 2012, 2013 & 2014)
 Rugby World Cup Sevens Champions (2001 & 2013)
 Commonwealth Games Rugby Sevens Gold Medalist (1998, 2002, 2006 & 2010)
 NPC Coach of the Year in (2000 for Bay of Plenty)
 NZRU Coach of the Year (2010)
 IRB Hall of Fame Member
 Knight Companion of The New Zealand Order of Merit

References

1955 births
Living people
World Rugby Hall of Fame inductees
New Zealand rugby union coaches
Rugby sevens in New Zealand
Knights Companion of the New Zealand Order of Merit
Rugby players and officials awarded knighthoods
New Zealand Olympic coaches
New Zealand national rugby sevens team coaches
New Zealand rugby union players
Waikato rugby union players
Bay of Plenty rugby union players
New Zealand male rugby sevens players
New Zealand international rugby sevens players
Samoa national rugby sevens team coaches